Nathan Filer is a British writer best known for his debut novel, The Shock of the Fall. This won several major literary awards, including the Costa Book of the Year and the Betty Trask Prize. It was a Sunday Times Bestseller, and has been translated into thirty languages.

Life and career
Filer was born in Bristol in 1980. He attended the Ridings High School, a large secondary school located in the village of Winterbourne in South Gloucestershire. In 2002 he trained as a psychiatric nurse gaining a first class degree in Mental Health Nursing from the University of the West of England and later worked in mental health research at the University of Bristol.

He also worked as a performance poet contributing regularly to festivals and spoken-word events across the UK, including Glastonbury, Latitude, Shambala, Port Eliot and the Cheltenham Literature Festival. His poetry has been broadcast on television and radio, including BBC Radio 4's Bespoken Word and Wondermentalist Cabaret. In 2005 Filer's comedy short film Oedipus won the BBC Best New Filmmaker Award and numerous international prizes.

The Shock of the Fall describes the life of a boy from Bristol dealing with his grief at the death of his brother, and experience of mental health care services for schizophrenia. Reviewing the book in The Psychologist, Caroline Flurey writes, "This is a beautifully poignant book, written with sympathy and sensitivity, well deserving of its Costa Book of the Year award."

Filer has written on a range of issues for The Guardian. A story he wrote for The New York Times that described working with the International Solidarity Movement in Palestine was adapted for an episode of the Israeli prime time radio show, Israel Story, featuring Filer and his partner. He has also been a panelist on the BBC Radio 2 Book Club, BBC Radio 3's Free Thinking and BBC Radio 4's Open Book, Front Row, All in the Mind and the Today Programme. In 2017 he presented an Archive on 4 documentary entitled The Mind in the Media in which he explored representations of mental illness and their impact. This was shortlisted for a Mind Media Award in the best radio programme category.

Nathan Filer's first book of non-fiction, The Heartland: Finding and Losing Schizophrenia, was published by Faber and Faber in 2019. It was a Sunday Times Book of the Year and the charity, Rethink Mental Illness, named it as one of their Mental Health Books of the Decade. It was also longlisted for the Rathbones Folio Prize.

Filer has been awarded the honorary degree of Master of Letters from the University of the West of England and the honorary degree of Doctor of Liberal Arts from Abertay University. These degrees were conferred in recognition of his role in raising awareness through literature and his commitment to mental health care.

He holds a master's degree in Creative Writing from Bath Spa University, where he is a Reader and Senior Lecturer.

Books
The Shock of the Fall (HarperFiction, 2013; The Borough Press, 2014)
The Heartland (also published as This Book will Change Your Mind about Mental Health ) (Faber, 2019)

Awards and honours
2013 Costa Book Awards First Novel Award for The Shock of the Fall
2013 Costa Book Awards Book of the Year for The Shock of the Fall
2014 Betty Trask Prize winner for The Shock of the Fall
2014 Specsavers National Book Awards Popular Fiction Book of the Year for The Shock of the Fall
 2014 Writers' Guild of Great Britain (WGGB Awards) Best First Novel for The Shock of the Fall
 2015 Honorary Degree of Master of Letters from the University of the West of England
 2015 Honorary Doctorate of Liberal Arts from Abertay University
 2017 Mind Media Awards Radio Category shortlisted for The Mind in the Media
 2020 Rathbones Folio Prize longlist for The Heartland

References

External links
 Nathan Filer website

British writers
Academics of Bath Spa University
Psychiatric nurses
Living people
Year of birth missing (living people)